The Center for Excellence in Disaster Management and Humanitarian Assistance (CFE) is a direct reporting unit to the U.S. Indo-Pacific Command (USINDOPACOM) and principal agency to promote disaster preparedness and societal resiliency in the Asia-Pacific region.  As part of its mandate, CFE facilitates education and training in disaster preparedness, consequence management and health security to develop domestic, foreign and international capability and capacity.

CFE partners with a wide variety of national and international governmental, nongovernmental and international organizations to provide relevant education, training, interagency coordination and research. CFE's initiatives include establishing field offices at each US Regional Combatant Command and establishing strategic partnerships with public and private sector entities, such as Asia Pacific Center for Security Studies (APCSS), Pacific Disaster Center (PDC), Harvard Humanitarian Initiative, University of Hawaii, foundations, institutes, and universities.

Directors
Capt. (Ret.) Frederick M. "Skip" Burkle Jr., Navy (1994–2000)
Capt. (Ret.) Gerard (Pete) Bradford, Navy (January 2001 – June 2008)
Mr. Douglas Wallace, (Acting Director) (June 2008 – October 2008)
Lt. Gen. (Ret.) John F. Goodman, Marine Corps (October 2008 – February 2012)
Col. Philip A. Mead, Army, (Interim Director) (February 2012 – May 2013)
Brig. Gen. (Ret.) Pamela K. Milligan, Air Force (May 2013 – May 2014)
 Col. Joseph D. Martin, Air Force (May 2014 – June 2016)
 Mr. Douglas Wallace, (Acting Director) (June – October 2016)
 Col. (Ret.) Joseph D. Martin, Air Force (October 2016 – present)

Courses/Workshops/Seminars
The Health Emergencies in Large Populations (H.E.L.P.) course is hosted by the Center for Excellence in Disaster Management and Humanitarian Assistance in collaboration with the International Committee of the Red Cross and the partnership of University of Hawaii's John A. Burns School of Medicine's Office of Public Health Studies. This is a three-week, intensive, graduate-level training course, providing participants with an understanding of the major public health issues to be addressed among populations affected by natural disasters, complex emergencies, and internal displacement.

References

Military in Hawaii
Humanitarian military operations
Honolulu County, Hawaii
Disaster preparedness in the United States
United States Department of Defense agencies
1994 establishments in Hawaii